Mani Menon, born 9 July 1948 in Trichur, India, is an American surgeon whose pioneering work has helped to lay the foundation for modern Robotic Cancer Surgery. He is the founding director and the Raj and Padma Vattikuti Distinguished Chair of the Vattikuti Urology Institute at the Henry Ford Hospital in Detroit, MI, where he established the first cancer-oriented robotics program in the world. Menon is widely regarded for his role in the development of robotic surgery techniques for the treatment of patients with prostate, kidney, and bladder cancers, as well as for the development of robotic kidney transplantation.Menon is the recipient of the Gold Cystoscope award (American Urological Association, 2001), Hugh Hampton Young award (American Urological Association, 2011), the Keyes Medal (American Association of Genitourinary surgeons, 2016), the prestigious B.C. Roy award (Awarded by the President of India, for his achievements in the fields of urology and robotics).

Pioneering RoboUro surgeries and mentoring others in such highly technical delicate work truly makes him the FATHER OF ROBOURO, especially ROBO-TAP (Trans Abdominal Prostatectomy)

Early years and urological career 
Menon developed a novel technique to measure androgen receptors in the human prostate. At the age of 34, Menon became the chairman of the Urology department at the University of Massachusetts Medical Center in Worcester, Massachusetts. During early career, his major contributions were in the field of kidney stone disease where he helped develop the use of intra-operative ultrasonography as an aid to renal stone management  and also devised methods to quantify citrate and oxalate levels in urine using ion chromatography.

Robotic surgery 
In 1997, Menon was recruited to become chairman of urology at Henry Ford Hospital in to revive the prostate cancer program.  In 2001, Henry Ford Hospital's urology department would receive a $20 million donation from the Vattikuti foundation. The donation helped establish the Vattikuti Urology Institute (VUI) and would allow Menon's team to explore minimally invasive means of treating prostate cancer.  Menon and the staff at the VUI developed robotic procedures in general (for example, for bladder and kidney cancer) and prostatectomy in particular. The robotic prostatectomy developed by Menon is called the "Vattikuti Institute Prostatectomy". Specialised laparoscopic instruments are used for the procedure. During the operation, images from a 3-D camera are projected to a remote console. The surgeons operates in virtual reality, observing the images on a screen. This technology serves to make the surgery less invasive and more precise. Menon has performed nearly 4,000 robotic prostatectomies and is considered a world authority on the use robotic surgery for prostate cancer. Under the leadership of Dr. Menon, the VUI established the first ever robotic training program in the world; for prostatectomy in 2000, for cystectomy in 2003  and for nephrectomy in 2006  and most recently, in 2013, for kidney transplantation (trial ongoing).

In his years as Director of VUI, Menon has trained and mentored fellow surgeon, Ashutosh Tewari. To this day, Menon and Tewari collaborate on clinical manuscripts, research abstracts, conference lectures, and other projects. Both surgeons have significantly influenced the field of robotic surgery as it applies to urology, refining patient outcomes as well as boosting the surgical robot industry.

In November 2011, Dr. Mani Menon was the keynote presenter and surgeon at prominent hospitals in six of India's major cities as part of the Vattikuti Foundation "Road Show".  The Road Show was designed as a way to teach and inspire the medical community and public in India about the benefits of robotic surgery. The undertaking began in Gurgaon, and when it was over, two weeks later, 28 robotic procedures would demonstrate procedures in Urology and gynecology to very interested audiences. Lectures and media interviews helped the public gain an understanding.

Honors and awards

See also
Vattikuti Urology Institute
International Robotic Urology Symposium

References

External links
Dr. Mani Menon's website

American surgeons
Indian emigrants to the United States
Johns Hopkins University alumni
1948 births
Living people
Scientists from Thrissur
Fellows of the American College of Surgeons